The 2018 Verizon IndyCar Series was the 23rd season of the Verizon IndyCar Series and the 107th official championship season of American open wheel racing. The premier event was the 102nd Indianapolis 500, with Takuma Sato entering as the defending Indianapolis 500 winner. Josef Newgarden entered the season as the defending National Champion.

The season marked the debut of a new universal aerokit, replacing the manufacturer-designed kits used from 2015 to 2017.

It was the final season for Verizon Communications as the series sponsor as well as being the final season that the series was broadcast by both ABC and NBC Sports. A new series sponsor was introduced and NBC became the sole broadcaster for the series beginning in the 2019 season.

Honda won the engine manufacturer's championship for the first time since 2005 as an engine manufacturer competitor. Robert Wickens won Rookie of the Year despite missing the final three races after a crash at the ABC Supply 500 at Pocono. James Hinchcliffe won the most popular driver award. Will Power won the 102nd Indianapolis 500. Scott Dixon won his fifth IndyCar title, and is now second to A. J. Foyt's all-time record for United States open wheel titles. Dixon won three races over the course of the season.

Series news
On October 20, 2017, Verizon Communications announced that it would exit its title sponsorship deal for the series after the 2018 season. This will not affect its vehicle sponsorship with Team Penske.
PFC became the IndyCar Series' brake caliper supplier beginning in the 2018 season.
Kyle Novak was confirmed as Race Director on January 5, replacing Brian Barnhart, who left to become president of Harding Racing. The three-man stewarding panel of Dan Davis, Arie Luyendyk and Max Papis, introduced when Barnhart was first named Race Director, will remain intact.
On March 21, 2018, NBC Sports (which serves as the existing cable rightsholder of the series through NBCSN) announced that it would become the sole television rights-holder of the IndyCar Series from 2019 through 2021, replacing the previous split between ABC and NBCSN. Eight races per season will air on NBC, including the Indianapolis 500.

Technical changes
All IndyCar Series machines feature an all-new universal bodywork, inspired by CART's 1990s and 2000s bodywork, but still keep the Dallara DW12 chassis base. This new chassis configuration is dubbed the IR18, and will be used until at least 2022. For the first time since the 1996 Indy Racing League and 2007 Champ Car seasons respectively, cars will have a roll hoop without an airbox.
All IndyCar Series entrants will begin utilizing F1-style LCD steering wheel display dashes, a new Cosworth CCW Mk2 steering wheel with a configurable display unit, and new electronic components. The current Cosworth-Pi Research Sigma Wheel Display dash had been used since the 2000 season will be retired permanently, but several teams will opt to keep the old Cosworth Sigma Wheel Display dash for one more season due to cost reasons.
Due to the reduced amount of downforce produced by the 2018 spec aerokits, Firestone introduced new rain tires to improve grip in wet conditions for road/street races.
In the next step to increase driver safety through cockpit protection, IndyCar announced that Scott Dixon would test a windscreen, a possible alternative to the 'halo' device used by Formula One, at ISM Raceway on February 8.

Confirmed entries
The following teams, entries, and drivers have been announced to compete in the 2018 NTT IndyCar Series season. All teams will use a spec Dallara DW12 chassis with UAK18 aero kit and Firestone tires.

Team changes
Chip Ganassi Racing announced that the team will scale down to a two-car team for the first time since 2010 due to cost efficiency, with Scott Dixon remaining at the No. 9 car. CGR announced on October 25, 2017, that 2017 IndyCar Series Rookie of the Year Ed Jones would drive the No. 10 car in 2018, replacing Tony Kanaan.

Team Penske also downsized to three cars, due to Hélio Castroneves moving to Team Penske's WeatherTech SportsCar Championship team from the 2018 season onwards. However, Castroneves returned for the 2018 Indianapolis 500 with Team Penske for a one-off appearance.

Michael Shank Racing competed in six races in the 2018 season with driver Jack Harvey, with a technical partnership with Schmidt Peterson Motorsports. The team was renamed Meyer Shank Racing on April 6, 2018, after Sirius XM CEO Jim Meyer joined as a team co-owner.

Carlin entered the series with two full-time Chevrolet-powered entries for the 2018 season, running ex-Chip Ganassi Racing drivers Max Chilton and Charlie Kimball.

Harding Racing confirmed a full-time schedule with Gabby Chaves after running part-time in 2017. Brian Barnhart was named president of the team on November 29, leaving his post as president of race operations and race director of IndyCar. Following the Road America round, Barnhart confirmed rumours that they wish to expand to fielding two cars as early as the latter part of the 2018 season, specifically naming Sonoma. He further confirmed the team was in talks with several drivers including current Indy Lights drivers.

Lazier Partners Racing did not enter the Indianapolis 500 for the first time since 2012 due to crash damage incurred at the 2017 Indianapolis 500 by Buddy Lazier to their only car.

Driver changes
After winning the 2017 Indy Lights championship, Kyle Kaiser participated in four IndyCar events in 2018 with Juncos Racing, including the Indianapolis 500 and IndyCar Grand Prix. On January 5, 2018, Juncos announced Formula V8 3.5 driver René Binder would contest the races in St. Petersburg, Barber, Mid-Ohio, and Toronto, with an entry at Detroit being confirmed later.

After competing at Barber for Ed Carpenter Racing as a replacement for J. R. Hildebrand and at the Indianapolis 500 for A. J. Foyt Enterprises in 2017, Zach Veach made his full-season début with Andretti Autosport, replacing Takuma Sato.

After competing in road and street courses only for Ed Carpenter Racing in 2017, Spencer Pigot made his full-season début with the team, replacing J. R. Hildebrand in the No. 21 car. Former Formula 2 driver Jordan King will drive the No. 20 on road and street courses.

2017 Indianapolis 500 winner Takuma Sato left Andretti Autosport after only one season with the team, and returned to Rahal Letterman Lanigan Racing for the 2018 season.

Stefan Wilson joined Andretti Autosport to return to the Indianapolis 500 for the first time since 2016.

After spending four seasons with Chip Ganassi Racing, Tony Kanaan switched to A. J. Foyt Enterprises for the 2018 season.

After six seasons in the German Deutsche Tourenwagen Masters, Robert Wickens made the switch to IndyCar to drive the No. 6 car for Schmidt Peterson Motorsports, replacing Mikhail Aleshin. Wickens previously replaced Aleshin in the first practice session at Road America in 2017, but did not get to compete in the race. Wickens suffered severe injuries in a crash at the 2018 ABC Supply 500 and was forced to miss the rest of the season. Due to damage incurred in the crash, the #6 car was withdrawn for the next race at Gateway. On August 29, SPM announced Carlos Muñoz as Wickens' replacement in the #6 car at the Portland and Sonoma rounds.

On November 16, 2017, A. J. Foyt Enterprises announced that Brazilian Indy Lights driver Matheus Leist would drive the No. 4 car in 2018, replacing Conor Daly. Leist became the youngest IndyCar Series rookie since Marco Andretti in 2006.

After six seasons with Stewart-Haas Racing in NASCAR, Danica Patrick announced intentions to return to the Indianapolis 500 for the first time since 2011. The 2018 Indianapolis 500 was the last race of Patrick's professional career. She will run a third entry for Ed Carpenter Racing, carrying sponsorship from former long-time partner GoDaddy.

After spending one season with A. J. Foyt Enterprises, Carlos Muñoz rejoined Andretti Autosport for the Indianapolis 500.

On February 6, 2018, 2017 World Series Formula V8 3.5 champion Pietro Fittipaldi was announced to drive the #19 for Dale Coyne Racing in seven races, including the 2018 Indianapolis 500. The #19 was driven by Zachary Claman DeMelo, who partook in the 2017 Indy Lights season with Carlin and the 2017 GoPro Grand Prix of Sonoma with Rahal Letterman Lanigan Racing, in the other 10 events. On May 4, Fittipaldi was injured in a crash while qualifying for the 2018 6 Hours of Spa-Francorchamps. DeMelo took over the #19 for both Indianapolis races and Texas, while Trident Formula 2 driver and Haas F1 test driver Santino Ferrucci was signed for the two Detroit races.

On March 1, 2018, it was confirmed that Nazareth, Pennsylvania native Sage Karam would return to race in the 102nd Indianapolis 500 for Dreyer & Reinbold Racing. This was the 3rd straight and 4th total Indianapolis 500 between them. The primary sponsor for Karam's car was WIX Filters.

On March 6, 2018, it was announced Conor Daly would be drive in the 102nd Indianapolis 500. He raced for Thom Burns Racing with Air Force as the primary sponsor.

On March 20, 2018, it was announced Pippa Mann would drive a 4th car for Dale Coyne Racing at the Indianapolis 500, with sponsorship from Donate Life Indiana.

On April 12, Dreyer & Reinbold Racing announced that J. R. Hildebrand would drive for the team in their second entry into the Indianapolis 500.

On April 13, 2018, it was announced that Jonathan Byrd's Racing, Hollinger MotorSport, and Belardi Auto Racing would work in conjunction with A. J. Foyt Enterprises to field a car for James Davison for the Indianapolis 500.

On May 10, Juncos Racing announced that Alfonso Celis Jr. would make his IndyCar debut with the team at Road America. On August 3, the team announced that Celis would also compete at Portland.

On July 10, Harding Racing announced that Conor Daly would replace Gabby Chaves for round 12 in Toronto. The team also stated that they would experiment with their driver lineup for the remainder of the season in preparation for 2019. They want to test current top three Indy Lights drivers Colton Herta, Santiago Urrutia and Patricio O'Ward, the latter having already received a seat fitting with the team. Nevertheless, Chaves is expected to return to the track in 2018 and remain under contract as the team's driver through 2019. Daly would be confirmed for the Mid-Ohio round on July 24. On September 2, it was announced that 2018 Indy Lights champion Patricio O'Ward and 2018 Indy Lights runner-up Colton Herta would make their IndyCar debuts with Harding at the final round at Sonoma.

Schedule

Schedule changes and notes
On September 26, 2017, Phoenix International Raceway's name was changed to ISM Raceway after a $100 million sponsorship deal with Ingenuity Sun Media, or ISM.
Watkins Glen was dropped from the calendar, after only two races since its return in 2016. The round was replaced with a race at Portland International Raceway, after an 11-year absence since Portland's last Champ Car event.
The Autódromo Hermanos Rodríguez in Mexico City was explored as a possible host of a race in August, but the deal was not put together and the race was not put on the calendar.
The Honda Indy Grand Prix of Alabama was started on April 22 and was stopped due to rain on lap 22. The race was resumed on April 23.

Results

Points standings

 Ties are broken by number of wins, followed by number of 2nds, 3rds, etc., then by number of pole positions, followed by number of times qualified 2nd, etc.

Driver standings
 The Indianapolis 500 and Sonoma rounds award double points.
 At all races except the Indy 500, the number 1 qualifier earns one point. At double header races, the fastest qualifier of each qualifying group earns one championship point.
 Entrant-initiated engine change-outs before the engines reach their required distance run will result in the loss of ten points.
 NOTE: The distance run will be based on the total distance raced by that entrant with the engine in question, regardless of driver.

Entrant standings 

 Based on the entrant, used for oval qualifications order, and starting grids when qualifying is cancelled.
 Only full-time entrants, and at-large part-time entrants shown.

Manufacturer standings

 All manufacturer points (including qualifying points, race finish points, and race win bonus points) can only be earned by full-season entrants.
 The top two finishing entrants from each manufacturer in each race score championship points for their respective manufacturer. The manufacturer that wins each race will be awarded five additional points, which can be determined through bold in-line notation.
 At all races except the Indy 500, the manufacturer who qualifies on pole earns one point. At the Indy 500, the fastest Saturday qualifier earns one point, while the pole position winner on Sunday earns two points. It can be determined through italic in-line notation. But, in Gateway, as qualifying was rained out, no point will be awarded for pole position.
The manufacturer with the most points from each race is noted by an asterisk (*).
 For every full-season engine used during the Indy 500 that reaches 2,000 total miles run, the manufacturer earns bonus points equal to that engine's finishing position in the race.
 Ties are broken by number of wins, followed by number of 2nds, 3rds, etc.

Footnotes

References

External links
 

 
IndyCar Series seasons
IndyCar Series
IndyCar